Aaron McEneff (born 9 July 1995) is an Irish professional footballer who plays as a midfielder for Perth Glory in the A-League.

McEneff was born in Derry and played youth football with Institute and Tottenham Hotspur before starting his professional career with Derry City.

In November 2020, he was called up to the Republic of Ireland senior squad for the Nations League game against Bulgaria.

Early life

McEneff was born in Derry and grew up in the Cornshell Fields estate in the city. He attended St. Columb's College while playing youth football for Don Boscos and Maiden City Academy. He has two brothers, Nathan and Jordan. Jordan currently plays for Derry City.

Club career

Early career
McEneff began his career at Institute, playing in the NIFL Championship. He had trials with Kilmarnock and Tottenham Hotspur in early 2012 before impressing for the latter in a youth game against Aston Villa and being snapped up on a two-year scholarship deal in May 2012. Tottenham Technical Director at the time, Tim Sherwood, remarked that McEneff reminded him of "a young Roy Keane." His international clearance did not arrive until January 2013 and he was only allowed to begin playing competitive games after this. He progressed well enough to earn a one-year professional deal in summer 2014, although a long-term knee injury that saw him miss four months at the start of the 2014–15 U21 Premier League season stunted his progress. He regained his place in the U21 side, however his contract wasn't renewed and he was released in June 2015.

Derry City
McEneff went on trial with Nottingham Forest and Sheffield Wednesday before he returned to his hometown club Derry City to sign an 18-month contract under manager Peter Hutton on 30 July 2015. McEneff made his league debut for Derry in a 2-0 home defeat to Dundalk on 14 August 2015. Initially, McEneff found his form was inconsistent as he struggled to mentally deal with the setback of his departure from Tottenham, however his performances improved after a sustained run of games towards the end of 2015. He finished the season with 9 league appearances. He credits moving back to the League of Ireland with helping him to develop as a player and gain experience of playing real football.

After gradually adapting to life at the club, McEneff established himself as a key player for Derry City. 2016 was his first full season in the League of Ireland and he made 29 league appearances scoring six goals. McEneff signed a new two-year contract extension with the club in September 2016. In 2017 he scored 9 goals in 29 league appearances and also appeared in both legs of the Europa League first qualifying round tie against Midtjylland scoring once.

Shamrock Rovers
In November 2018 McEneff left his hometown and signed for Shamrock Rovers In his first season with Rovers he helped them to a 2nd place finish in the league and was part of the team who defeated Dundalk on penalties to win the FAI Cup final. This was Rovers 25th FAI Cup and the first time the club had lifted the trophy since 1987 In 2020 McEneff was a member of the Shamrock Rovers side who won their 18th League of Ireland title.

Heart of Midlothian
On transfer deadline day, 1 February 2021, McEneff signed a 2-and-a-half-year contract with Scottish Championship side Heart of Midlothian. He made his debut on the 5th February 2021, coming off the bench for Armand Gnanduillet in a 1–0 win over Ayr United at Somerset Park. He scored his first goal for the Tynecastle club on 9 April 2021 against Alloa in a 6-0 victory that took the club to within two points of the second tier title. McEneff scored in a 3–0 win over Inverness Caledonian Thistle, a game which his side were awarded the 2020–21 Scottish Championship trophy. He scored his first goal of the 2021–22 season in a 3–2 defeat to Celtic in a Scottish League Cup tie at Celtic Park, beating Joe Hart at his near post in the 92nd minute. His first Scottish Premiership goal came on 6 November 2021, in a 5–2 win over Dundee United At Tynecastle Park.

Perth Glory
In July 2022, McEneff signed for A-League side Perth Glory, subject to international clearance.

International career
McEneff has represented Northern Ireland at U21, U19, and U17 levels. He was a member of the Northern Ireland U19 team which won the 2014 Milk Cup Elite Section, scoring the winning goal against Canada U20. It was reported in August 2016 that McEneff was set to switch allegiance to the Republic of Ireland, however although he has had discussions about his future, no decision has been made and he has put his international career on hold for the time being. Northern Ireland manager Michael O'Neill was critical of the FAI for entering into discussions with McEneff describing them as "morally poor", however Republic of Ireland U21 boss Noel King responded by clarifying that the initial communication had come from McEneff's Dublin-born father and in the end the discussions did not lead to the paperwork going through.

On the 16 November 2020, McEneff was called up Stephen Kenny's Republic of Ireland senior squad for the Nations League game against Bulgaria.

Career statistics

Honours
Derry City
League of Ireland Cup: 2018

Shamrock Rovers
FAI Cup: 2019
League of Ireland Premier Division: 2020

Heart of Midlothian
Scottish Championship: 2020–21

References

External links
 

1995 births
Living people
Sportspeople from Derry (city)
Republic of Ireland association footballers
Association football midfielders
Northern Ireland youth international footballers
League of Ireland players
Scottish Professional Football League players
Tottenham Hotspur F.C. players
Derry City F.C. players
Shamrock Rovers F.C. players
Heart of Midlothian F.C. players
Perth Glory FC players
Expatriate footballers in Scotland
Expatriate soccer players in Australia